Sir John Montague Brocklebank, 5th Baronet (3 September 1915 – 13 September 1974) was the 5th baronet of the Brocklebank baronets,
the chairman of the shipping company Cunard, and a first-class cricketer for Cambridge University, Lancashire, Bengal and various amateur sides before and after the Second World War.

Brocklebank was born in Hoylake, Cheshire and died in Malta. He was educated at Eton College and gained the rank of Major in the Royal Artillery (Territorial Army). He fought in the Second World War, and was a POW from 1943 to 1945. He was a younger son of Sir Aubrey Brocklebank, 3rd Baronet and succeeded his unmarried brother Sir Thomas Aubrey Lawies Brocklebank, 4th Baronet, also a first-class cricketer for Cambridge University, to the baronetcy in 1953. He was in turn succeeded by his own son Sir Aubrey Thomas Brocklebank, the 6th and present Baronet.

He appeared in 21 first-class matches as a righthanded batsman who bowled right arm leg break or medium pace. He scored 112 runs with a highest score of 23 and held seven catches. He took 68 wickets with a best analysis of six for 92. Brocklebank was chosen in the England team to play three Tests in India in 1939-40, but the tour was cancelled due to the outbreak of World War II.

References

External links

1915 births
1974 deaths
People from Hoylake
People educated at Eton College
Alumni of Magdalene College, Cambridge
English cricketers
Cambridge University cricketers
Lancashire cricketers
Gentlemen cricketers
Baronets in the Baronetage of the United Kingdom
Bengal cricketers
Marylebone Cricket Club cricketers
Free Foresters cricketers